The Medical and Chirurgical Society of London was a learned society of physicians and surgeons which was founded in 1805 by 26 practitioners in these fields, who left the Medical Society of London (founded 1773) in reaction to the autocratic style of its president, James Sims. Among its founders there were William Saunders (1743–1817), its first president; John Yelloly (1774–1842), Sir Astley Cooper (1768–1841), the first treasurer; Alexander Marcet (1770–1822) and Peter Mark Roget (1779–1869).

According to its charter, the Medical and Chirurgical Society of London was founded "for the purpose of conversation on professional subjects, for the reception of communications and for the formation of a library" and served "several branches of the medical profession".

In 1834 the Society received a Royal charter, thus becoming the Royal Medical and Chirurgical Society of London. This society merged with several other specialist societies, from 1907 to 1909, to form the current Royal Society of Medicine.

The 17 societies which merged with the Medical and Chirurgical Society to form the Royal Society of Medicine were:

 Pathological Society of London (1846–1907),
 Epidemiological Society of London (1850–1907),
 Odontological Society of Great Britain (1856–1907),
 Obstetrical Society of London (1858–1907),
 Clinical Society of London (1867–1907),
 Dermatological Society of London (1882–1907),
 British Gynaecological Society (1884–1907),
 Neurological Society of London (1886–1907),
 British Laryngological, Rhinological and Otological Association (1888–1907),
 Laryngological Society of London (1893–1907)
 Society of Anaesthetists (1893–1908),
 Dermatological Society of Great Britain and Ireland (1894–1907)
 British Balneological and Climatology Society (1895–1909),
 Otological Society of the United Kingdom (1899–1907),
 Society for the Study of Diseases in Children (1900–1908),
 British Electrotherapy Society (1901–1907), and
 Therapeutical Society (1902–1907).

Honorary Fellows of the society included Charles Darwin, Louis Pasteur, Edward Jenner and Sigmund Freud. Other presidents of note were the "three great from Guy's Hospital", Richard Bright (1837); Thomas Addison (1849) and Sir James Paget (1875), as well as Joseph Hodgson (1851) and Frederick William Pavy (1900).

Presidents

References

External links
 History of the Royal Society of Medicine.
 The Medical Society of London.

1805 establishments in England
Medical associations based in the United Kingdom